Hopewell Township is one of the fourteen townships of Perry County, Ohio, United States.  The 2000 census found 2,163 people in the township, 1,965 of whom lived in the unincorporated portions of the township.

Geography
Located in the northern part of the county, it borders the following townships:
Bowling Green Township, Licking County - north
Hopewell Township, Muskingum County - northeast corner
Madison Township - east
Clayton Township - southeast corner
Reading Township - south
Thorn Township - west

The village of Glenford is located in northwestern Hopewell Township.

Name and history
Hopewell Township was organized around 1810. It is one of five Hopewell Townships statewide.

Government
The township is governed by a three-member board of trustees, who are elected in November of odd-numbered years to a four-year term beginning on the following January 1. Two are elected in the year after the presidential election and one is elected in the year before it. There is also an elected township fiscal officer, who serves a four-year term beginning on April 1 of the year after the election, which is held in November of the year before the presidential election. Vacancies in the fiscal officership or on the board of trustees are filled by the remaining trustees.

References

External links
County website

Townships in Perry County, Ohio
Townships in Ohio
1810 establishments in Ohio
Populated places established in 1810